The 2005 Men's European Volleyball Championship Qualification was the qualifying event for the 24th edition of the event, hosted in Belgrade and Rome from September 2 to September 11, 2005 and organised by Europe's governing volleyball body, the European Volleyball Confederation. The qualifying matches were all played in 2004. The four group winners and two highest scorers qualified.

Group A

|}

Group B

|}

Group C

|}

Group D

|}

References
 CEV Results

Q
E
Qualification for volleyball competitions